Juuso Simpanen (born 8 June 1991) is a Finnish former footballer. He has played for Finnish Ykkönen club Seinäjoen Jalkapallokerho.

After starting his career with local TiPS, young Simpanen moved to neighbours FC Honka, where he finished his football grooming and raised to the first team squad in 2010. Simpanen was part of the team that won the Finnish League Cup in the same year. He was awarded as man of the match in the final against JJK.

References
UEFA Profile

External links
 Juuso Simpanen at FC Honka 
 
 

1991 births
Living people
Finnish footballers
FC Honka players
Veikkausliiga players
Association football midfielders
Sportspeople from Vantaa